The  Richmond Revolution season was the team's second season as a professional indoor football franchise and second in the Indoor Football League (IFL). One of twenty-two teams competing in the IFL for the 2011 season, the Richmond, Virginia-based Richmond Revolution were members of the Atlantic Division of the United Conference.

Under the leadership of head coach Tony Hawkins, the team played their home games at the Arthur Ashe Athletic Center in Richmond, Virginia.

Regular season

Schedule
Key:

Standings

Roster

References

Richmond Revolution
Richmond Revolution